The Ninetieth Arkansas General Assembly was the legislative body of the state of Arkansas in 2015 and 2016. In this General Assembly, the Arkansas Senate and Arkansas House of Representatives were both controlled by the Republicans. In the Senate, 23 senators were Republicans, 11 were Democrats, and one position was vacant until April. In the House, 69 representatives were Republicans, 30 were Democrats, and one was independent.

Sessions
The 90th General Assembly opened session on January 12, 2015. A special session was called on May 26, 2015 to move Arkansas's primary date to the SEC Primary.

Major events

Vacancies
 Senator Greg Standridge (R-16th) won a special election in February 2015, but was not seated until April 2015

Senate

Leadership

Officers

Floor Leaders

Senators

House of Representatives

Leadership

Representatives

References

Arkansas legislative sessions
2015 in Arkansas
2015 U.S. legislative sessions